Hohtenn is a village and former municipality in the district of Raron in the canton of Valais in Switzerland. Since 1 January 2009, it has been part of the municipality of Steg-Hohtenn.

It is served by trains to Bern, Thun and Brig. Additionally, a PostAuto bus service links Hohtenn village to Steg.

References

External links
 

Former municipalities of Valais